Cualac may refer to:
 Cualac (fish), a genus of fish in the family Cyprinodontidae
 Cualac Municipality
 Cualac, Guerrero